Dutch Harbor – Where the Sea Breaks Its Back is an album by post-rock/ambient musical collective Boxhead Ensemble, released on March 11, 1997 through Atavistic Records. It consists of an alternative live soundtrack for the 1998 documentary film Dutch Harbor.

Track listing

Personnel 
Musicians
Joe Ferguson – guitar (10, 12)
David Grubbs – guitar (6, 9, 10, 12)
Charles Kim – guitar (1–3, 9, 10, 12), violin (4, 10), piano (12)
Michael Krassner – musical direction, guitar (4, 10), piano (5), mixing, mastering
Doug McCombs – bass guitar (6, 10, 12)
Mother Gromoff – voice (7)
Jim O'Rourke – guitar (1, 3, 4, 6, 8, 11)
Will Oldham – vocals (11), guitar (11)
Rick Rizzo – guitar (6)
Buck Rogers – voice (12)
Ken Vandermark – reeds (1, 3, 4, 6)
David Williams – voice (3)
Production and additional personnel
Braden King – engineering, mixing, mastering, tape (4)

References 

1997 soundtrack albums
Atavistic Records albums
Boxhead Ensemble albums
Film soundtracks